Epra is a village in Põhja-Sakala Parish, Viljandi County in central Estonia, located just south of the town of Suure-Jaani, the administrative centre of the municipality. It has a population of 89 (as of 2009).

References

Villages in Viljandi County